Kipling is a crater on Mercury. It has a diameter of 164 kilometers. Its name was adopted by the International Astronomical Union (IAU) in 2010. Kipling is named for the British author Rudyard Kipling, who lived from 1865 to 1936.

There is a large, irregular depression within Kipling that is probably a volcanic pit.  It is also a confirmed dark spot.

Kipling is north of the smaller Capote crater.

References

Impact craters on Mercury